"The Two Brothers and the Gold" ("Два брата и золото") is a short story by Leo Tolstoy written in 1885.

Influence

According to Nadejda Gorodetzky, this story discusses the joys of poverty if poverty is willingly accepted.  According to the Cambridge Companion to Tolstoy, one should regard this text as different from other of Tolstoy's works, in that the narrator's stance is more objective and neutral.

Publication history

The work was published in collections in 1882 (with translations by Aylmer Maude and editing by Leo Wiener and Charles Theodore Hagberg Wright), in 1903, and again in 2016.

See also
 Bibliography of Leo Tolstoy

References

External Links

 Original Text
 As Translated by Robert Nisbet Bain
 The Two Brothers and the Gold: Bain Translation, from RevoltLib.com
 The Two Brothers and the Gold: Bain Translation, from Marxists.org
 As Translated by Leo Wiener
 The Two Brothers and the Gold: Wiener Translated, from RevoltLib.com
 The Two Brothers and the Gold: Wiener Translation, from Marxists.org

Short stories by Leo Tolstoy
1860 short stories